Tonto is a traditional Ugandan fermented beverage made from bananas. It is also referred to as mwenge bigere. 

Tonto is made by ripening green bananas in a pit for several days. The juice is then extracted, filtered, and diluted before being mixed with ground and roasted sorghum. This mixture is fermented for two to four days.

Tonto has an alcohol content ranging from six to eleven percent by volume.

The production of tonto is a source of income for many families in the banana-growing regions of central and western Uganda.

References
Global Status Report on Alcohol 2004, World Health Organization, 2004.

Banana drinks
Fermented drinks